Sailing/Yachting is an Olympic sport starting from the Games of the 1st Olympiad (1896 Olympics) in Athens, Greece. With the exception of 1904 and the canceled 1916 Summer Olympics, sailing has always been included on the Olympic schedule. The Sailing program of 1968 consisted of a total of five sailing classes (disciplines). For each class seven races were scheduled from 14 October 1968 to 21 October 1968 off the coast of Acapulco in the Bay of Acapulco. The sailing was done on the triangular type Olympic courses.

Venue 

Acapulco Bay is located on the Pacific coast in the state of Guerrero, 250 miles from Mexico City. The facilities at Club de Yates were improved and modified. 20,000 square metres of new docks provided with potable water, electricity and telephones were created. The buoys bearing colored flags delineated the three course areas.

Technical control was assured by a staff of measurers for gauging all yachts before racing.

The Olympic Village, located in the Caleta Hotel, provided accommodation for 503 competitors, trainers, team managers from 40 countries.

Competition

Overview

Continents 
 Asia
 Oceania
 Europe
 Americas

Countries

Classes (equipment) 

 = Male,  = Female,  = Open

Medal summary

Medal table

Remarks

Sailing 
 This Olympic sailing event was gender independent, but turned out to be a Men-only event. This was one of the triggers to create gender specific events. This however had to wait until 1988.
  was trying to win his fifth Gold medal. This time in the Star. He came close. 4th.
  won his first Olympic medal (Gold) in his boat Supercalifragilisticexpialidocious. It is difficult to appoint Olympic records to sailing, but the score of this Flying Dutchman team would hold probably the record of best olympic score: DSQ, 1, 1, 1, 1, 1, 2!
 In each of the five classes there was a major difference in points between the gold and the silver medalists.

Sailors 
During the Sailing regattas at the 1968 Summer Olympics among others the following persons were competing in the various classes:
 Royalties
 , King of Norway, HRH Crown Prince Harald in the 5.5 Metre
 Sport managers
 , President International Olympic Committee, Jacques Rogge in the Finn
 , Future president International Sailing Federation, Peter Tallberg in the Star
 , Future president International Sailing Federation, Paul Henderson in the Finn
 . Future holder of the Silver Olympic Order, George Andreadis in the Flying Dutchman

Notes

References 
 
 
 
 
 
 
 
 

 

 
1968 Summer Olympics events
1968
1968 in sailing
Sailing competitions in Mexico